Siemers is a surname. Notable people with this surname include:

 Jimmy Siemers (born 1982), American water skier
 Paige Siemers (born 1982), American long-distance track runner

See also
Siemer